The 50th District of the Iowa House of Representatives in the state of Iowa.

Current elected officials
Pat Grassley is the representative currently representing the district.

Past representatives
The district has previously been represented by:
 Theodore R. Ellsworth, 1971–1973
 Willis E. Junker, 1973–1979
 James D. O'Kane, 1979–1983
 Philip E. Brammer, 1983–1989
 Joyce Nielsen, 1989–1993
 David Osterberg, 1993–1995
 Lynn S. Schulte, 1995–1997
 Ro Foege, 1997–2003
 Dave Tjepkes, 2003–2013
 Pat Grassley, 2013–present

References

050